The Alsetex 410 is a stun grenade manufactured by the French company Alsetex.

Main characteristics
 The intense sound (160 decibels, measured at 15 metres) causes temporary deafness
 Employed in a closed space, the Alsetex 410 Splinterless stun hand grenade has no destructive effect on the surroundings
 The body and igniter fuze are made of special plastic material and generate no splinters

Dimensions
Diameter 	50 mm
Length 	129 mm
Gross weight 	58 gr

References

External links
  Alsetex

Stun grenades
Hand grenades of France